The 1960 Buffalo Bills season was the club's first season in the American Football League (AFL). Home games were played at War Memorial Stadium in Buffalo, New York. Head Coach Buster Ramsey's Bills compiled a 5–8–1 record, placing them third in the AFL Eastern Division.

Unlike most of the offensive-minded AFL, the Bills focused on defense, allowing the third-fewest points in the league (303). Their defensive line boasted Laverne Torczon and Chuck McMurtry (both of whom were 1st Team All-AFL in 1960), as well as a mobile, hard-hitting middle linebacker in Archie Matsos, who was AFL All-Star in each of the three seasons he spent in Buffalo. The Bills' defense led the league in fewest passing yards allowed (2,130) and most passes intercepted (33), with NFL veterans Richie McCabe and Jim Wagstaff in their secondary.

The Bills' offense, however, was not as competent. The 1960 Bills had the worst passing attack in the AFL, throwing for 2,346 yards. Former Cleveland Browns quarterback Tommy O'Connell started the season 1–3 before being replaced by Johnny Green. Green would go 3–3 as a starter, despite only completing 39% of his passes.
Richie Lucas, the Bills' first ever draft pick, was a bust, both at quarterback and at halfback, throwing only 49 passes all season.

The Bills did show glimmers of hope on offense, however, by showcasing running back Wray Carlton and flanker Elbert Dubenion, who would later go on to be AFL All-Stars for the Bills in the mid-1960s.

Uniforms 
In their first season, the Bills wore silver helmets and light blue home jerseys. Their road jerseys were white with light blue letters. The team wore white pants both at home and on the road. The Bills' helmets displayed the player's number in light blue on the side where the logo would normally be (much like the Alabama Crimson Tide's helmets).

The uniforms, not coincidentally, resembled those of the Detroit Lions of the National Football League. Bills owner Ralph C. Wilson, Jr. grew up in Detroit, and had once been a minority owner in the Lions.

Offseason 

When Lamar Hunt announced formation of the American Football League in the summer of 1959, Buffalo was one of the target cities Hunt sought, based on its previous success with the Bills in the AAFC. His first choice of owner, however, turned him down; Pat McGroder (then a liquor store owner and sports liaison with the city of Buffalo) was still hopeful that the threat of the AFL would prompt the NFL to come back to Buffalo to try and stop the AFL from gaining a foothold there (as the NFL would do with teams in Minnesota, Dallas, St. Louis and later Atlanta). McGroder's hopes never came to fruition, and in 1961, he took a position in the new Bills organization.

Harry Wismer, who was to own the Titans of New York franchise, reached out to insurance salesman and automobile heir Ralph C. Wilson, Jr. to see if he was interested in joining the upstart league. (Both Wismer and Wilson were minority owners of NFL franchises at the time: Wilson part-owned the Detroit Lions, while Wismer was a small partner in the Washington Redskins but had little power due to majority owner George Preston Marshall's near-iron fist over the team and the league). Wilson agreed to field a team in the new league, with the words "Count me in. I'll take a franchise anywhere you suggest." Hunt gave him the choice of six cities: Miami, Buffalo, Cincinnati, St. Louis, Atlanta, or Louisville, Kentucky; after being turned down in his effort to put a team in Miami, he consulted with Detroit media, who connected him with McGroder and The Buffalo News managing editor Paul Neville; their efforts to lobby Wilson to come to Buffalo were successful, and Wilson sent Hunt a telegram with the now-famous words, "Count me in with Buffalo."

The Buffalo Bills were a charter member of the American Football League (AFL) in 1960. After a public contest, the team adopted the same name as the AAFC Buffalo Bills, the former All-America Football Conference team in Buffalo.

1960 AFL Draft 

Two Rounds of draft were held, the first round called "First Selections", the second round "Second Selections".

First Selections 
 Charles Bevins, HB, Morris Brown
 Don Black, E, New Mexico
 Bill Burrell, G, Illinois
 Paul Choquette, FB, Brown
 Mike Connelly, C, Utah State
 Jim Conroy, FB, USC
 Bob Coogan, T/G, Utah
 Louis Cordileone, G, Clemson
 Ted Dean, FB, Wichita
 Willie Evans, HB, Buffalo
 Ross Fichtner, QB, Purdue
 Jon Gilliam, C, E. Texas State
 Al Goldstein, E, North Carolina
 James Houston, E, Ohio State
 Ray Jauch, HB, Iowa
 Robert Khayat, T, Mississippi
 Ken Kirk, C, Mississippi
 Jim Leo, E, Cincinnati
 Richie Lucas, QB, Penn State
 Charles McMurtry, T/G, Whittier
 Bubba Meyer, E, TCU
 Ron Miller, E, Vanderbilt
 Gale Oliver, T, Texas A&M
 Harold Olsen, T, Clemson
 Ray Peterson, HB, West Virginia
 Vince Promuto, G, Holy Cross
 Rene Ramirez, HB, Texas
 Len Rohde, T, Utah State
 Joe Schaffer, T, Tennessee
 Wayne Schneider, HB, Colorado State
 Ivan Toncic, QB, Pittsburgh
 Larry Wilson, HB, Utah

Second Selections 
 Dwight Baumgartner, E, Duke
 Tom Day, T/G, North Carolina A&T
 Babe Dreymala, T/G, Texas
 Joe Gomes, HB, South Carolina
 Mike Graney, E, Notre Dame
 Pete Hall, QB, Marquette
 Jim Hanna, E, USC
 Ernie Hanson, C, Arizona State
 John Littlejohn, HB, Kansas State
 Marvin Luster, E, UCLA
 Dwight Nichols, HB, Iowa State
 Merlin Priddy, HB, TCU
 Gary Ratkowski, HB, Citadel
 Dale Rems, T/G, Purdue
 Carl Robison, T/G, S. Carolina State
 Bob Sliva, T/G, Stephen F. Austin
 James Sorey, T/G, Texas Southern
 Jerry Thompson, T/G, Oklahoma
 Royce Whittington, T/G, Southwestern
 Darrell Harper, HB, Michigan

Personnel

Staff/Coaches

Roster

1960 regular season

Season schedule

Preseason

Regular season

Season summary

Week 1 at Titans

Week 2

Week 3 

    
    

Buffalo's first win in franchise history.

Week 4

Week 5

Week 6 vs Titans

Week 7

Standings

References 

 Buffalo Bills on Pro Football Reference
 Buffalo Bills on jt-sw.com

Buffalo Bills
Buffalo Bills seasons
Buffalo